Marcelo Uchoa Zarvos is a Brazilian pianist and composer.

Life and career
Zarvos was born in São Paulo. He began in classical music in his teens and studied at the Berklee College of Music.

He is more known for jazz and had success with the album Dualism accompanied by saxophonist Peter Epstein. He has done several film scores including Kissing Jessica Stein, The Door in the Floor, Sin Nombre, and Boynton Beach Club. Most recently, he composed the score for American Ultra (2015), starring Jesse Eisenberg and Kristen Stewart, and The Choice, starring Benjamin Walker and Teresa Palmer.

His music has been recorded a number of times by the string quartet ETHEL. He composed the score for the 2007 film The Air I Breathe, starring Kevin Bacon, Julie Delpy, Brendan Fraser, Andy Garcia, Sarah Michelle Gellar, Emile Hirsch, and Forest Whitaker. In 2011 he composed the score for Beastly, which stars Vanessa Hudgens and The Beaver starring Mel Gibson and Jodie Foster. He also composed the score for the 2012 film Won't Back Down which stars Viola Davis, Maggie Gyllenhaal, and Holly Hunter. In 2012 he composed the score for The Words which stars Bradley Cooper, Zoe Saldana, and Dennis Quaid.

Filmography

Theatrical films

Television films

Short films

Television series

References

External links
 Zarvos.com bio page
 

Living people
New-age pianists
Brazilian jazz pianists
Brazilian film score composers
Male film score composers
Musicians from São Paulo
Berklee College of Music alumni
Male pianists
21st-century pianists
21st-century male musicians
Male jazz musicians
Varèse Sarabande Records artists
Year of birth missing (living people)